The Black Rock Football Club is an Australian rules football club located in the Melbourne bayside suburb of Black Rock. The club will compete in 2nd division in the 2016 season.

History
The club commenced official competition play in 1913 by joining the Federal Football League (FDL). Apart from a brief period during the late 1920s in Victorian Amateur Football Association, Black Rock remained in the FDL until the early 1970s.

The club folded in 1972, but was successfully revived and entered into the Eastern Suburbs Churches Football Association in 1976. Black Rock transferred to the South East Suburban Football League in 1986  before that league changed its name to the Southern Football League in 1992. The SFL then absorbed the ESCFA in 1993.

From 2008 to 2012 the club participated in Division 2 of the SFL after winning the 3rd division premiership in 2007.

At the end of the 2012 season, the Southern Football League stripped the club of their premiership points, invoking a by-law that requires all clubs to be 'financial'. Subsequently, the club was deemed to have finished last in Division 2 and was relegated to Division 3.

Senior Premierships
 Federal Football League
 1935, 1936, 1954
 East Suburban Churches Football Association
 1980 (E Grade), 1984 (D Grade)
  Southern Football League
 2004, 2007, 2015, 2022 (all in Division 3)

References

External links
 Black Rock homepage

Australian rules football clubs in Melbourne
Southern Football League (Victoria)
Australian rules football clubs established in 1908
1908 establishments in Australia
Sport in the City of Bayside